Elections to Southwark Council were held in May 1986.  The whole council was up for election. Turnout was 36.7%.

Election result

|}

Ward results

Abbey

Alleyn

Barset

Bellenden

Graeme Geddes was a sitting councillor for Browning ward

Jessica Wanamaker was a sitting councillor for Chaucer ward

Bricklayers

Browning

Ann Goss was a sitting councillor for The Lane ward

Brunswick

Burgess

Cathedral

Chaucer

College

Consort

Dockyard

Rupert Doyle was a sitting councillor for Friary ward

Faraday

Friary

Tony Goss was a sitting councillor for Newington ward

Liddle

Lyndhurst

Tobias Eckersley was a sitting councillor for Ruskin ward

Newington

Riverside

Rotherhithe

Ruskin

Rye

Elsie Headley was a sitting councillor for Alleyn ward

St Giles

The Lane

Leslie Alden was a sitting councillor for St Giles ward

Richard Clough was a sitting councillor for Rye ward

Waverley

By-Elections

The by-election was called following the resignation of Cllr. George Walker

The by-election was called following the resignation of Cllr. Ali Balli

The by-election was called following the resignation of Cllr. Elsie Headley

The by-election was called following the resignation of Cllr. Linda Oram

The by-election was called following the resignation of Cllr. Joan Price

The by-election was called following the resignation of Cllr. Kenneth Carlisle

The by-election was called following the resignation of Cllr. Alan Crane

The by-election was called following the resignation of Cllr. David Main

References

Council elections in the London Borough of Southwark
1986 London Borough council elections
20th century in the London Borough of Southwark